Coombs is an English surname. Notable people with the surname include:

 Anthony Coombs (politician) (born 1952), British politician
 Anthony Coombs (Canadian football) (born 1992), Canadian football player
 Bobby Coombs (1908–1991), American baseball player
 Clyde Coombs (1912–1988), American psychologist
 David Coombs (born 1937), British author, historian and teacher
 David Coombs (lawyer) (born 1969), American lawyer
 Derek Coombs (1931–2014), British politician 
 Doug Coombs (1957–2006), American skier and mountaineer
 Ernie Coombs (1927–2001), Canadian/American children's entertainer
 Frank Coombs (1853–1934), American politician
 H.C. Coombs (1906–1997), Australian economist
 Jack Coombs (1882–1957), American baseball player
 James Coombs (1869–1935), American football coach
 Joe Coombs (born 1991), British canoe slalom athlete
 John Coombs (1922–2013), British racing driver and racing team owner
 Kris Coombs-Roberts, Welsh guitarist
 Mary Coombs (1929–2022), English computer programmer
 Melvin Coombs (1948–1997), American cultural educator and cultural interpreter
 Nathan Coombs (1826–1877), American founder of Napa, California
 Orde M. Coombs (1939–1984), Saint Vincent-born American writer and editor
 Pat Coombs (1926–2002), English actress
 Patricia Coombs (born 1926), American children's author and illustrator
 Peter Coombs (born 1928), English priest
 Robert Coombs (politician) (born 1959), Australian politician
 Robert Coombs (cricketer) (born 1959), English cricketer
 Robin Coombs (1921–2006), British immunologist
 Simon Coombs (born 1947), British politician
 Stephen Coombs (born 1960), British pianist
 Ted Coombs (born 1954), American artist, roller skater and forensic scientist 
 W. H. Coombs (1816–1896), English/Australian priest

See also
 Coombe (disambiguation)
 Combs (disambiguation)
 Coomes (disambiguation)

English-language surnames